This is a list of heads of state of Mali since the country gained independence from France in 1960 to the present day.

A total of seven people have served as head of state of Mali (excluding three acting presidents). Additionally, two people, Amadou Toumani Touré and Assimi Goïta, have served on two non-consecutive occasions.

The current head of state of Mali is interim president Assimi Goïta, who took power for a second time on 24 May 2021, after dismissing previous interim president Bah Ndaw in the 2021 coup d'état. He has since been constitutionally declared interim president of Mali.

Heads of state

Titles
 1960–1965: Head of State
 1965–1968: President of the Republic
 1968–1969: Chairman of the Military Committee for National Liberation
 1969–1979: Head of State
 1979–1991: President of the Republic
 1991: Chairman of the National Reconciliation Council
 1991–1992: Chairman of the Transitional Committee for the Salvation of the People
 1992–2012: President of the Republic
 2012: Chairman of the National Committee for the Restoration of Democracy and State
 2012–2020: President of the Republic
 2020: Chairman of the National Committee for the Salvation of the People
 2020–present: President of the Transition

Key
Political parties

Other factions

Status

List

Timeline

Latest election

See also
 Politics of Mali
 Vice President of Mali
 First Lady of Mali
 List of prime ministers of Mali
 List of colonial governors of Mali

Notes

References

External links
 Koulouba
 World Statesmen – Mali

Mali
 
Political history of Mali
Politics of Mali
Heads of state
1965 establishments in Mali
Heads of state